Charles Arthur Baker  (1856–1937) was a 19th-century professional baseball outfielder. He played for the Chicago Browns/Pittsburgh Stogies in the Union Association in 1884. He later played in the New England League in 1886-1887.

External links

Major League Baseball outfielders
Chicago Browns/Pittsburgh Stogies players
19th-century baseball players
Baseball players from Massachusetts
People from West Boylston, Massachusetts
1856 births
1937 deaths
Haverhill (minor league baseball) players
Sportspeople from Worcester County, Massachusetts